The women's 20 kilometres walk event at the 2007 Summer Universiade was held on 9 August.

Results

References
Results

20
2007 in women's athletics
2007